{{DISPLAYTITLE:C3H5NS}}
The molecular formula C3H5NS (molar mass: 87.14 g/mol, exact mass: 87.0143 u) may refer to:

 Ethyl thiocyanate
 3-Mercaptopropionitrile
 Thiazoline